Qaravəlli or Qaravəlili or Karavelli or Kara-Vali or Kora-Velly may refer to:
Karavelli, Neftchala, Azerbaijan
Qaravəlli, Aghjabadi, Azerbaijan
Qaravəlli, Agsu, Azerbaijan
Qaravəlli, Ismailli, Azerbaijan
Qaravəlli, Shamakhi, Azerbaijan
Qaravəlli, Zardab, Azerbaijan
Qaravəlili, Balakan, Azerbaijan
Qaravəlili, Imishli, Azerbaijan
Qarah Vali, Iran